Shangmeilin station is a station on Line 4 and Line 9 of the Shenzhen Metro. Line 4 platforms opened on 16 June 2011 and Line 9 platforms opened on 28 October 2016

Station layout

Exits

Around the station
 Shenzhen Mosque

References

External links
 Shenzhen Metro Shangmeilin Station (Line 4) (Chinese)
 Shenzhen Metro Shangmeilin Station (Line 4) (English)
 Shenzhen Metro Shangmeilin Station (Line 9) (Chinese)
 Shenzhen Metro Shangmeilin Station (Line 9) (English)

Railway stations in Guangdong
Shenzhen Metro stations
Futian District
Railway stations in China opened in 2011